Ceromitia benedicta is a species of moth of the  family Adelidae. It was first described in 1918 by Edward Meyrick and is known from South Africa.

Description
The species was described from a single male specimen caught in Pretoria in December. Edward Meyrick gave the specimen's appearance as follows:

References

Adelidae
Endemic moths of South Africa
Moths described in 1918